Viktor Belyatsky (born 8 November 1970) is a Belarusian weightlifter. He competed in the men's middle heavyweight event at the 1996 Summer Olympics.

References

External links
 
 
 

1970 births
Living people
Belarusian male weightlifters
Olympic weightlifters of Belarus
Weightlifters at the 1996 Summer Olympics
World Weightlifting Championships medalists
People from Navapolatsk
Sportspeople from Vitebsk Region